λ Ophiuchi, Latinized as Lambda Ophiuchi, is a triple star system in the equatorial constellation of Ophiuchus. It has the traditional name Marfik , which now applies exclusively to the primary component. The system is visible to the naked eye as a faint point of light with an apparent visual magnitude of 3.82. It is located approximately 173 light-years from the Sun, based on its parallax, but is drifting closer with a radial velocity of –16 km/s.

System
The inner pair form a binary star system with an orbital period of 192 years and an eccentricity of 0.611. Both components are A-type main-sequence stars, indicating that they are generating energy through core hydrogen fusion. The brighter member of this pair, designated component A, is the primary for the system with a visual magnitude of 4.18 and a stellar classification of A0V. The secondary, component B, is magnitude 5.22 and class A4V.

It has a common proper motion and is at approximately the same distance as the other two stars, although any orbit would last for hundreds of thousands of years. It has an estimated spectral type of K6.

Nomenclature

λ Ophiuchi is the system's Bayer designation. The designations of the three components as Lambda Ophiuchi A, B and C derive from the convention used by the Washington Multiplicity Catalog (WMC) for multiple star systems, and adopted by the International Astronomical Union (IAU).

It bore the traditional name Marfik (or Marsik), from the Arabic مرفق marfiq "elbow". In 2016, the International Astronomical Union organized a Working Group on Star Names (WGSN) to catalogue and standardize proper names for stars. The WGSN decided to attribute proper names to individual stars rather than entire multiple systems. It approved the name Marfik for the component Lambda Ophiuchi A on 12 September 2016 and it is now so included in the List of IAU-approved Star Names.

References

External links
Various star data

A-type main-sequence stars
Suspected variables
Binary stars
Triple stars

Ophiuchus (constellation)
Ophiuchi, Lambda
Durchmusterung objects
Ophiuchi, 10
148857
080883
6149
Marfik